Deckers Outdoor Corporation, doing business as Deckers Brands, is a footwear designer and distributor based in Goleta, California, United States.  It was founded in 1973 by University of California, Santa Barbara alumni Doug Otto and Karl F. Lopker. In 1975, the company was incorporated in California under the name Deckers Corporation. In October 1993, Deckers initiated a public offering of stock in its company.

Deckers portfolio of brands includes: UGG, Teva, Sanuk, Hoka One One and Koolaburra. Deckers Brands products are sold in more than 50 countries and territories through select department and specialty stores, 138 Company-owned and operated retail stores, and select online stores, including Company-owned websites.

History

Milestones
Some key milestones include:
In 1973, Karl Lopker began his career making and selling flip-flops at craft fairs along the West Coast of the United States.

In 1975, Doug Otto visited Hawaii on business and found that locals referred to his sandals as "deckas", a slang word based on their striped layered construction that resembled a "deck" of stacked wood. Liking the name, Lopker and Otto named the brand Deckers.

In 1985, Deckers expanded its range of sandals when it entered into a licensing agreement to produce and distribute Teva sandals.

In 1993, Otto renamed his company Deckers Outdoor Corporation when it went public on the NASDAQ, and Deckers purchased Simple Shoes.

In 1995, Deckers purchased UGG Holdings.

In 2002, Deckers purchased Teva's patents, trademarks, and other assets.

In 2003, Deckers’ UGG boots became well known after Oprah Winfrey included the boots on The Oprah Winfrey Shows Favorite Things segment.

In 2010, Deckers acquired MOZO Shoes, a brand that produced footwear for the culinary industry.

In 2011, Deckers acquired Sanuk shoes.

In 2012, Deckers acquired Hoka One One.

In 2015, Deckers acquired Koolaburra.

Corporate structure
Deckers corporate subsidiaries include:

In the Americas
 Deckers Cabrillo, LLC (located in California) 
 Deckers Consumer Direct Corporation (located in Flagstaff, Arizona), an e-commerce corporation
 Deckers Outdoor Canada ULC
 Deckers Retail, LLC (located in California)
 Deckers International Limited, located in Bermuda

In Asia
 Deckers Asia Pacific Limited (located in Hong Kong)
 Deckers (Beijing) Trading Co., Ltd (located in China)
 Deckers Japan G.K.
 Deckers Macau Limited
 Deckers Outdoor (Guangzhou) Consulting Co., Ltd (located in China)
 StellaDeck Fashion Limited (located in Hong Kong)

In Europe
 Deckers Benelux B.V., (located in the Netherlands)
 Deckers Dutch Coöperatie U.A. (located in the Netherlands)
 Deckers Europe Limited (located in the UK)
 Deckers UK LTD (located in the UK)
 Deckers France II 
 Deckers France SAS

 Teva 

Geophysicist Mark Thatcher invented Teva (pronounced "teh-vah" not "tee-vah," Hebrew for "nature").  While working as a rafting guide in 1982 he noticed the lack of proper shoes for river activities.  Sneakers would become heavy when wet and would take days to dry, and flip-flops would slide off feet very easily.

Thatcher added a nylon ankle strap to a traditional thong-style sandal, thus creating the first sports sandal. Thatcher patented his invention and signed an agreement with the shoemaker California Pacific to manufacture the shoes, while he marketed the "amphibious utility sandals" as their salesman, selling 200 pairs the first year. Although it was effective water sports footwear, it proved less effective for regular sports, as the first Teva users often complained of blisters between the first and second toes caused by the thong-style strapping system. However, in 1984 a sudden high demand of Teva sandals arose as young Americans found the sandal fashionable. California Pacific then claimed rights over the Teva name and patent, stating that Thatcher was merely an employee of their company. Thatcher sued California Pacific and won his case the following year, severing links with California Pacific.  He then started the Tevas company in Flagstaff, Arizona.

In late 1985, Thatcher set up an exclusive licensing agreement with Deckers Corporation to manufacture and distribute Teva sandals. Deckers eventually obtained exclusive rights to Teva, including US patent #4,793,075 for the basic design and a trademark for the brand name. The sandal was redesigned, creating the Universal Strapping System. The first model, called "Hurricane", is the basis of all Teva sandals.

On November 25, 2002, Deckers Outdoor Cooperation acquired the worldwide Teva patents, trademarks, and other assets from Mark Thatcher. Teva sandals are currently manufactured in China, Vietnam, and Cambodia.

Construction

The basic model consists of a two-layer sole:

 The inner sole is softer and serves as the footbed, and most of the models come with arch support and Microban Zinc, a technology that reduces odor and kills bacteria. 
 The outer sole is harder and is formulated to have a good grip on wet surfaces.

The Universal Strapping System consists of three parts:

 The toe post: a strap that goes on the front of the sandal, across the toes and between the inner and outer sole.
 The heel strap: Goes around the ankle to prevent the sandal from sliding off.
 The side strap: Connects the toes post and the heel strap on the outer side of the sandal, this prevents the sandal from stretching in awkward positions where injury could occur.

Each strap is connected to the others by triangular "rings"; each strap goes around one side of the ring.

UGG AustraliaUGG''' brand boots, known as UGG Australia in Australia and New Zealand, have a sheepskin upper with a wool inner lining and a tanned outer surface worn by men and women.  Surfing helped popularize the boots outside of Australia and New Zealand, when surfer Brian Smith started selling the boots in the US through UGG Holdings, Inc. in 1979.

Impact of the UGG brand on performance
Deckers is considered a niche market supplier due to the dominance of the brand boots, a fashion luxury item,  in its sales, and as such the company is more reliant than traditional clothing manufacturers on its products remaining fashionable.

In the economic downturn of 2008, Deckers continued to show earnings and sales growth.

In 2010, UGG boots were Deckers' primary source of revenue, accounting for 77% of net sales and 80% of the company's revenue.

In 2012, Deckers raised prices on its UGG boots stated to be to cover the rising cost of materials. However, the resulting decline in sales volume over the first half of 2012 led to a price reduction, which stimulated sales. UGG boots accounted for 87% of the company's revenue with some analysts expressing concern that UGG was losing its appeal. While 2012 annual revenue remained approximately the same as in the prior year, profit was down 36.1% from 2011, and share prices dropped 62%.Deckers Rallies on New Takeover Buzz investorguide.com November 27, 2012

Trademark dispute

UGG is a registered trademark in the US, Europe and many other countries. There have been various disputes within Australia, Europe, and the United States about the validity of Ugh/Ugg trademark. Deckers trades as Ugg Holdings, Inc. in Australia, where it is known for a trademark dispute over the use of the widely used term "ugg boots"(sometimes called uggs).

In 1971, Australian surfer Shane Steadman began selling ugg boots and registered the name Ugh-boots as a trademark in Australia. In 1979, Brian Smith, another Australian surfer, brought several pairs of Australian-made sheepskin boots to the US and began selling them in New York and California. He set up Ugg Holdings Inc. and in 1985, registered a US trademark on a rams head logo with the words "Original UGG Boot UGG Australia. He later acquired the Australian mark from Steadman. In 1995, he sold his interest to Deckers Outdoor Corporation. In 1996, Deckers registered a trademark for "UGG" in the US. In 1999, Deckers began asserting its new trademark and sent cease and desist letters to Australian manufacturers but did not press the issue beyond that.

In 2005, the validity of the UGG trademark was challenged in Federal Court in California; the court ruled for Deckers, stating that consumers in the United States consider Ugg to be a brand name. In his final order, the judge hearing the case stated that, although the defendants had provided anecdotal evidence of the term being used generically, Deckers had countered this by "submitted ... declarations from four footwear industry professionals, each of whom states that 'UGG' is widely recognized in the industry as a brand-name and not a generic term" and that the defendants' evidence "fails to demonstrate that the term 'UGG' is generic." In his finding the judge did not consider whether or not "ugg" was a generic term in Australia or New Zealand, as the doctrine of foreign equivalents only relates to non-English speaking countries. A similar challenge was also rejected by a Dutch court.

It was only in the early 2000s, when demand for ugg boots was soaring, partly as a result of several celebrity endorsements of the UGG brand, and Australian manufacturers began selling uggs over the Internet, that Deckers' law firm Middletons of Melbourne began a serious effort to halt Australian companies from using the word "ugg" in their salesefforts. In 2004, Deckers sent cease and desist letters to 20 Australian manufacturers, and Mortels Sheepskin Factory was prevented from selling uggs on eBay or from using the word in domain names.

In response to these actions by Deckers, Australian manufacturers formed the Ugg Boot Footwear Association to fight the corporation's claim, arguing that "ugg" is a generic term referring to flat-heeled, pull-on sheepskin boots. They further argued that Australian manufacturers had been making and trading this style of boot for decades, including in the US. In 2003, Bruce and Bronwyn McDougall, owners of Uggs-N-Rugs, a Western Australia-based manufacturer, started legal action alleging that Deckers had not actively used the UGH-BOOT registration in Australian commerce for the past three years. Their action was successful in 2006, and the UGH-BOOT registration was removed from the Australian Trademark Registry.Decision of a delegate of the Registrar of Trade Marks with reasons  published by IP Australia January 16, 2006 The officer who heard the case stated that the "evidence overwhelmingly supports the proposition that the terms (ugg, ugh and ug boots) are interchangeably used to describe a specific style of sheepskin boot and are the first and most natural way in which to describe these goods." The ruling only applies in Australia, with Deckers still owning the trademarks in all other jurisdictions, including the US, China, Japan and the European Union.

Counterfeit products

Deckers has also been challenged by the marketing of counterfeit products, principally from China. According to the Glasgow Evening Times in July 2010,

Gangs of criminals have flooded Glasgow with fake footwear. ... Authorities across the west of Scotland have seized hundreds of pairs of the must-have footwear ... Neil Coltart, at Glasgow City Council, said: "These boots come in boxes that look like the real thing, with tags and labels. But the product clearly isn't the quality you'd expecty from Ugg." ... Out of their slick packaging, the boots were clearly not made of Ugg's comfy sheepskin, but a cheap man-made fur. One even had its distinctive Ugg trademark glued onto its heel upside down. Holding up a pair, [Coltart] said: "I think most people would be pretty disappointed if they bought Ugg boots and brought these home."

In 2009, US customs agents confiscated 60,000 pairs of fake UGG boots, and the company took action against 2500 websites that were selling fraudulent products, as well as some 170,000 listings on eBay, Craigslist and similar sites.<ref name="NYT 7-31-10">Clifford, Stephanie. "Economic Indicator: Even Cheaper Knockoffs." The New York Times, July 31, 2010.</ref> Leah Evert-Burks, director of brand protection for Deckers, told The New York Times: "The consumer is blind as to the source of the product ... Counterfeit Web sites go up pretty easily, and counterfeiters will copy our stock photos, the text of our Web site, so it will look and feel like" the Deckers website.

Sanuk
Sanuk, a novelty sandal brand based in Southern California, was founded in 1997 and acquired by Deckers in 2011 for $120 million. "Sanuk" is the Thai word for fun. Founder Jeff Kelley, a Southern California native, started by making sandals out of indoor-outdoor carpet and inner tubes. Sanuk promotes a positive lifestyle, as its slogan ("Smile, Pass it On!") suggests. Sanuk's brand is distributed across the United States and in some 70 countries throughout Europe, Asia, South America and Australia. Sanuk was invented and patented by Jason Decker of Bettendorf. He was the first to wear and popularize them. In 2010, Sanuk's "Yoga Mat Sandal" was awarded SIMA's "Footwear Product of the Year".

References

External links 
 

Companies listed on the New York Stock Exchange
Companies based in Santa Barbara County, California
American companies established in 1973
Shoe companies of the United States
1973 establishments in California
1993 initial public offerings